George Ward was an Irish luthier and maker of violins and cellos from Dublin. His instruments are considered original in style with some resemblances to the Stradivarius model. One of his violins is preserved as part of a collection at the National Museum of Ireland, Dublin.

Early life

Very little is known about Ward's early life. It has been proposed that he was born in Dublin in 1715 to Samuel and Mary Ward, based on baptism records from the Church of St Nicholas Without, Dublin, 18 May 1715. He had a brother named John (1703–1778), whom there is also evidence of being baptized to the same parents and at the same church on 1 October 1704. John was also a violin maker based in Dublin. John's daughter, Isabelle, married Dublin guittar maker, William Gibson.

Career

The dates that Ward was active as a luthier are debated amongst historians. William Henley believed him to be active as early as 1710, probably based on the earliest date attributed to one of his instruments, supposedly labeled 1719. However, it has been suggested that Henley may have misread the label. Others date the start of his career as late as 1750, from which period there are more extant instruments. However, Ward is thought to have been working as a violin maker at Christ Church Yard, Dublin by around 1740. It is uncertain who Ward apprenticed with, but it is possible that he was a pupil of Dublin luthier Thomas Molineux (d. 1757), who also resided at Christ Church Yard. Furthermore, Ward branded his instruments 'WARD/DUBLIN' at the back below the button, a trait which he may have adopted from Molineux.

Some time between 1740 and 1750, Ward moved to Lee's Lane, Astor's Quay. It has been proposed that Ward may have taken on a young Thomas Perry as an apprentice because of the similarities between the style of their instruments. Perry also began his career as a luthier at Christ Church Yard and used to brand his instruments 'PERRY/DUBLIN' at the back below the button, a trait that he likely inherited from Ward. In 1764, Ward moved to Anglesea Street, where he remained and worked until his death in 1769. It has been suggested that Perry may have succeeded Ward at the same address in Anglesea Street, since he appears to have moved there about the same time as Ward's death, adding to the possibility that Perry was a former pupil of his.

It is considered that Ward developed his own original style of violin making. It is uncertain whether he inherited some of these unique traits directly from his teacher or developed them over time. The link between Ward's style and Perry's earlier instruments also suggests that Ward had his own unique style, which Perry supposedly adopted as his student. Ward's instruments have also been said to have close similarities to the Stradivarius model It is not known if he ever had the chance to study directly from an original Stradivarius or if he also adopted such traits from his teacher. In terms of his workmanship, Ward has been described by Rev. Morris and Henley as an "artist" and "maker of undoubted ability". Ward's surviving instruments have been described by Henley as having "very handsome wood and beautiful varnish" and as being "quite superior" to those of Perry. As well as branding his instruments in the usual manner with his name and place, Ward also branded them with a crowned harp on the button.

Extant instruments

It is not known how many instruments Ward produced in his lifetime. Some of them still survive today and occasionally come up for sale or auction, others are housed as part of collections and exhibits. One of Ward's finest violins was acquired by the National Museum of Ireland in 1891 and is preserved as part of a collection of musical instruments by Irish makers. The collection also includes instruments Perry, Molyneux, Delany and Mackintosh.

Some of Ward's extant instruments:

Violins
 1719: labelled 'Made by George Ward in Anglesey Street 17 Dublin 19' (may have been misread)
 (?): branded 'WARD/DUBLIN', National Museum of Ireland, Dublin
 : branded 'WARD/DUBLIN', private collection
 1753: formerly Graham collection
 1758: labelled 'Made by George Ward in Lee's Lane on Aston's Quay, Dublin, 1758'
 1764: labelled 'Made by George Ward in Anglesea Street in 1764'
 1766: labelled 'Made by George Ward in Anglesea Street 17 Dublin 66'

Cellos
 (?): similar to the 1753 violin

See also
John Delany (Irish luthier)
John Mackintosh (Irish luthier)
Thomas Molineux (Irish luthier)
Thomas Perry (Irish luthier)

References

Citations

Bibliography

External links
 George Ward on Dublin Music Trade
 George Ward on Brian Boydell Card Index
 George Ward on Tarisio
 George Ward on Brompton's

1715 births
1769 deaths
18th-century Irish businesspeople
18th-century Irish people
Bowed string instrument makers
Businesspeople from County Dublin
Irish luthiers
Irish musical instrument makers